The following Union Army units and commanders fought in the Seven Days Battles (from June 25 to July 1, 1862) of the American Civil War. Order of battle compiled from the army organization-return of casualties during the battle and the reports. The Confederate order of battle is listed separately.

Abbreviations used

Military rank
 MG = Major General
 BG = Brigadier General
 Col = Colonel
 Ltc = Lieutenant Colonel
 Maj = Major
 Cpt = Captain
 Lt = Lieutenant
 Sgt = Sergeant

Other
 w = wounded
 mw = mortally wounded
 k = killed
 c = captured

Army of the Potomac

MG George B. McClellan, Commanding

General Staff and Headquarters

General Staff
Chief of Staff: BG Randolph B. Marcy
Chief of Artillery: BG William F. Barry
Assistant Adjutant General: BG Seth Williams
Chief Quartermaster: BG Stewart L. Van Vliet

General Headquarters
Escort
 Oneida (New York) Cavalry: Cpt James B. McIntyre
 4th United States Cavalry (Companies A & E):  Cpt James B. McIntyre
Provost Marshal General: BG Andrew Porter
 McClellan Dragoons: Maj Alfred Pleasonton
 Sturges' Rifles: Maj Granville O. Haller
 93rd New York (Companies A, F, H, & K): Maj Granville O. Haller
 2nd United States Cavalry: Maj Alfred Pleasonton
 8th United States (Companies F & G): Cpt Royal T. Frank; Lt Eugene Carter
United States Engineers
 Battalion United States Engineers: Cpt James C. Duane
Engineer Brigade: BG Daniel P. Woodbury
 15th New York Engineers: Col John McLeod Murphy
 50th New York Engineers: Col Charles B. Stuart

II Corps

BG Edwin V. Sumner

III Corps

BG Samuel P. Heintzelman (w - Glendale)

IV Corps

BG Erasmus D. Keyes

V Corps

BG Fitz J. Porter

VI Corps

BG William B. Franklin

Artillery Reserve
Col Henry J. Hunt

Cavalry Reserve

Casey's Command

Notes

References
U.S. War Department, The War of the Rebellion: a Compilation of the Official Records of the Union and Confederate Armies, U.S. Government Printing Office, 1880–1901.

American Civil War orders of battle